Hesar (also Romanized as Ḩeşār) is a village in Miankuh Rural District, Chapeshlu District, Dargaz County, Razavi Khorasan Province, Iran. At the 2006 census, its population was 301, in 66 families.

References 

Populated places in Dargaz County